Rita Bokorné Liliom (born ) is a Hungarian female volleyball player, playing as an outside-spiker. She is part of the Hungary women's national volleyball team.

She competed at the 2015 Women's European Volleyball Championship. On club level she plays for Azzurra S. Casciano.

References

External links

1986 births
Living people
Place of birth missing (living people)
Hungarian women's volleyball players
Yeşilyurt volleyballers